HMS Seneschal was a S-class submarine of the third batch built for the Royal Navy during World War II. She survived the war and was sold for scrap in 1965.

Design and description
The last 17 boats of the third batch were significantly modified from the earlier boats. They had a stronger hull, carried more fuel and their armament was revised. They displaced  on the surface and  submerged. The S-class submarines had a crew of 48 officers and ratings.

For surface running, the boats were powered by two  diesel engines, each driving one propeller shaft. When submerged each propeller was driven by a  electric motor. They could reach  on the surface and  underwater.

Seneschal was armed with six 21 inch (533 mm) torpedo tubes in the bow. She carried six reload torpedoes for a grand total of a dozen torpedoes. Twelve mines could be carried in lieu of the torpedoes. The boat was also equipped with a 4-inch (102 mm) deck gun.

Construction and career
HMS Seneschal was built by Scotts, of Greenock and launched on 23 April 1945. So far she has been the only ship of the Royal Navy to bear the name Seneschal, after the office. She survived the Second World War, but endured several mishaps in post-war life. She suffered an explosion on 4 June 1947, and on 14 June 1952, she collided with the Danish frigate Thetis, south of the Isle of Wight. The submarine's periscope and radar mast were damaged. In 1953 she took part in the Fleet Review to celebrate the Coronation of Queen Elizabeth II. She was eventually sold, arriving at the yards of Clayton & Davie, Dunston, for breaking up on 23 August 1960.

Notes

References
 
  
 
 
 

 

British S-class submarines (1931)
1945 ships
World War II submarines of the United Kingdom
Royal Navy ship names